Leah Blatt Glasser is an American literary critic and Mary Eleanor Wilkins Freeman scholar at Mount Holyoke College. She was Dean of First-Year Studies and is currently a Lecturer in English at Mount Holyoke College. Her former student (the Pulitzer Prize-winning playwright, Suzan-Lori Parks) would later credit Glasser for her success.

Background
Glasser received her B.A. in 1972 and M.A. in 1973 from the State University of New York at Stony Brook and her Ph.D. from Brown University in 1982. She has taught at Mount Holyoke since year 1980 and is a contributing editor to the Heath Anthology of American Fiction.

Publications
 A Landscape of One's Own: Nature-Writing and Women's Autobiography, (forthcoming)
 In a Closet Hidden: The Life and Work of Mary E. Wilkins Freeman (University of Massachusetts Press, 1996).
 "She Is the One You Call Sister: Discovering Mary E. Wilkins Freeman," in Between Womened. Ascher, DeSalvo, and Ruddick (Routledge Press, 1994).
 Contributing Editor to The Heath Anthology of American Literature and Teaching Guidelines, Heath, 1997.

References

External links
Official site
Powell's book review
Glasser Writes about Author's "Hidden" Life

1950 births
Living people
American literary critics
Women literary critics
20th-century American women writers
20th-century American non-fiction writers
Brown University alumni
Mount Holyoke College faculty
21st-century American women writers
Stony Brook University alumni
American women non-fiction writers
21st-century American non-fiction writers
American women academics
American women critics